Étienne Jodelle, seigneur de Limodin (1532July 1573), French dramatist and poet, was born in Paris of a noble family.

He attached himself to the poetic circle of the Pléiade and proceeded to apply the principles of the reformers to dramatic composition. Jodelle aimed at creating a classical drama that should be in every respect different from the moralities and  that then occupied the French stage, his first play, Cléopâtre captive, was represented before the court at the hôtel de Reims in 1552. Jodelle himself took the title role, and the cast included his friends Remy Belleau and Jean Bastier de La Péruse, in honour of the play's success the friends organized a little etc. at Arcueil when a goat garlanded with flowers was led in procession and presented to the author—a ceremony exaggerated by the enemies of the Ronsardists into a renewal of the pagan rites of the worship of Bacchus.

Jodelle wrote two other plays. Eugène, a comedy satirizing the superior clergy, had less success than it deserved. Its preface poured scorn on Jodelle's predecessors in comedy, but in reality his own methods are not so very different from theirs. Didon se sacrifiant, a tragedy which follows Virgil's narrative, appears never to have been represented. Jodelle died in poverty in July 1573. His works were collected the year after his death by Charles de la Mothe. They include a quantity of miscellaneous verse dating chiefly from Jodelle's youth. The intrinsic value of his tragedies is small. Cléopâtre is lyric rather than dramatic. Throughout the five acts of the piece nothing actually happens. The death of Antony is announced by his ghost in the first act; the story of Cleopatra's suicide is related, but not represented, in the fifth. Each act is terminated by a chorus which moralizes on such subjects as the inconstancy of fortune and the judgments of heaven on human pride. Jodelle was a rapid worker, but idle and fond of dissipation. His friend Ronsard said that his published poems gave no adequate idea of his powers.

Jodelle's works are collected (1868) in the Pléiade française of Charles Marty-Laveaux. The prefatory notice gives full information of the sources of Jodelle's biography, and La Mothe's criticism is reprinted in its entirety.

References

External links
 Short biography

16th-century French dramatists and playwrights
16th-century French poets
1532 births
1573 deaths
Writers from Paris